Głotowo  is a village in the administrative district of Gmina Dobre Miasto, within Olsztyn County, Warmian-Masurian Voivodeship, in northern Poland.

When the area was Christianised through the Northern Crusades, Głotowo developed into an important Christian pilgrimage site.

The village has a population of 450.

References

Villages in Olsztyn County